Fenhu Lu Station is a station of Line 1, Suzhou Rail Transit. The station is located in Suzhou New District of Suzhou. It has been in use since April 28, 2012, the same time of the operation of Line 1.

Station

Accessible Information
 Fenhu Lu Station is a fully accessible station, this station equipped with wheelchair accessible elevators, blind paths with bumps, and wheelchair ramps. These facilities can help people with disabilities, seniors, youths, and pregnancies travel through Suzhou Rail Transit system.

Station configurations
L1 (First Floor/Street Level): Entrances/Exits (stairs and escalators); and elevators with wheelchair accessible ramps.

B1 (Mezzanine/Station Hall Level): Station Control Room; Customer Service; Automatic Ticket Vending Machines; Automatic Fee Collection Systems with turnstiles; stairs and escalators; and elevators with wheelchair accessible ramps.

B2 (Platform Level): Platform; toilet; stairs and escalators; elevators with wheelchair accessible ramps.

Station layout

First & Last Trains

Exits Information
Exit 1: South side of Zhuyuan Lu

Exit 2: South side of Zhuyuan Lu

Exit 3: North side of Zhuyuan Lu

Local Attractions
SuZhou Innovation Park
Fortune Plaza
SuZhou Foreign Language School
No.1 SND Middle School
XinSheng Garden
Century Garden
XinChuang Garden
TianDu Garden
HaoJingTianXia Garden

Bus Connections
Bus Stop: XinShengXinYuan Nan - Connection Bus Routes: 2, 4, 35, 64, 319, 400, 511, 622

Bus Stop: XinshengXinYuan ShouMoZhan - Connection Bus Routes: BRT 1

Bus Stop: XinQu YiZhong - Connection Bus Routes: 2, 4, 64, 319, 400, 622, BRT 1

References

Railway stations in Jiangsu
Suzhou Rail Transit stations
Railway stations in China opened in 2012